The Pulitzer Prize for Music is one of seven Pulitzer Prizes awarded annually in Letters, Drama, and Music. It was first given in 1943. Joseph Pulitzer arranged for a music scholarship to be awarded each year, and this was eventually converted into a prize: "For a distinguished musical composition of significant dimension by an American that has had its first performance in the United States during the year."

Because of the requirement that the composition have its world premiere during the year of its award, the winning work had rarely been recorded and sometimes had received only one performance. In 2004 the terms were modified to read, "For a distinguished musical composition by an American that has had its first performance or recording in the United States during the year."

History
In his will, dated April 16, 1904, Joseph Pulitzer established annual prizes for a number of creative accomplishments by living Americans, including prizes for journalism, novels, plays, histories and biographies, but did not establish a prize in music, choosing instead to inaugurate an annual scholarship for "the student of music in America whom the Advisory Board shall deem the most talented and deserving, in order that he may continue his studies with the advantage of European instruction." The Pulitzer Prize for Music was instituted in 1943 to recognize works of "music in its larger forms as composed by an American." The phrase "music in its larger forms" proved difficult to interpret for the advisory board and the prize's juries, resulting in controversies over the years. One critic of the award said, "The Prize Board could hardly have chosen more offensive words to communicate its message."

In 1965, the jury unanimously decided that no major work was worthy of the Pulitzer Prize. Instead, it recommended a special citation be given to Duke Ellington in recognition of his body of work, but the Pulitzer Board refused and therefore no award was given that year. Ellington responded: "Fate is being kind to me. Fate doesn't want me to be too famous too young." (He was then 67 years old.) Despite this joke, Nat Hentoff reported that when he spoke to Ellington about the subject, he was "angrier than I'd ever seen him before", and Ellington said, "I'm hardly surprised that my kind of music is still without, let us say, official honor at home. Most Americans still take it for granted that European-based music—classical music, if you will—is the only really respectable kind."

In 1996, after years of internal debate, the Pulitzer Board announced a change in the criteria for the music prize "so as to attract the best of a wider range of American music." The result was that the next year, Wynton Marsalis became the first jazz artist to win the Pulitzer Prize. But his victory was controversial because, according to the Pulitzer guidelines, his winning work, Blood on the Fields, a three-hour-long oratorio about slavery, should not have been eligible. Winning works are supposed to have had their first performance during the year of the award, but Marsalis's piece premiered on April 1, 1994, and its recording, released on Columbia Records, was dated 1995. Yet the piece won the 1997 prize. Marsalis's management had submitted a "revised version" of Blood on the Fields that "premiered" at Yale University after Marsalis made seven small changes. When asked what would make a revised work eligible, the chairman of that year's music jury, Robert Ward, said: "Not a cut here and there...or a slight revision", but rather something that changed "the whole conception of the piece." After being read the list of revisions made to the piece, Ward acknowledged that the minor changes should not have made it eligible, but said, "the list you had here was not available to us, and we did not discuss it."

Nine women have received the Pulitzer Prize: Ellen Taaffe Zwilich in 1983; Shulamit Ran in 1991; Melinda Wagner in 1999; Jennifer Higdon in 2010; Caroline Shaw in 2013; Julia Wolfe in 2015; Du Yun in 2017; Ellen Reid in 2019; and Tania León in 2021. In addition to being the first woman to receive the award, Zwilich was also the first woman to receive a Doctor of Musical Arts degree in composition at the Juilliard School of Music. Du is the first woman of color to receive the award. George Walker was the first African American composer to win the Prize, for his work Lilacs in 1996.

In 1992 the music jury, which that year consisted of George Perle, Roger Reynolds, and Harvey Sollberger, chose Ralph Shapey's Concerto Fantastique for the award. The Pulitzer Board rejected that decision and gave the prize to the jury's second choice, Wayne Peterson's The Face of the Night, the Heart of the Dark. The jury responded with a public statement that they had not been consulted in that decision and that the Board was not professionally qualified to make such a decision.  The Board responded that the "Pulitzers are enhanced by having, in addition to the professional's point of view, the layman's or consumer's point of view" and did not rescind its decision.

In 2004, responding to criticism, Sig Gissler, the administrator of the Pulitzer Prizes at the Columbia University School of Journalism, announced that the board wanted to "broaden the prize a bit so that we can be more assured that we are getting the full range of the best of America's music". Board member Jay T. Harris said, "The prize should not be reserved essentially for music that comes out of the European classical tradition."

The announced rule changes included altering the jury pool to include performers and presenters in addition to composers and critics. Entrants are no longer required to submit a score. Recordings are also accepted, although scores are still "strongly urged." Gissler said, "The main thing is we're trying to keep this a serious prize. We're not trying to dumb it down any way shape or form, but we're trying to augment it, improve it...I think the critical term here is 'distinguished American musical compositions.'" Reaction among Pulitzer Prize in Music winners has varied.

The Pulitzer Prize Advisory Board officially announced: "After more than a year of studying the Prize, now in its 61st year, the Pulitzer Prize Board declares its strong desire to consider and honor the full range of distinguished American musical compositions—from the contemporary classical symphony to jazz, opera, choral, musical theater, movie scores and other forms of musical excellence...Through the years, the Prize has been awarded chiefly to composers of classical music and, quite properly, that has been of large importance to the arts community. However, despite some past efforts to broaden the competition, only once has the Prize gone to a jazz composition, a musical drama or a movie score. In the late 1990s, the Board took tacit note of the criticism leveled at its predecessors for failure to cite two of the country's foremost jazz composers. It bestowed a Special Citation on George Gershwin marking the 1998 centennial celebration of his birth and Duke Ellington on his 1999 centennial year. Earlier, in 1976, a Special Award was made to Scott Joplin in the American Bicentennial year.  While Special Awards and Citations continue to be an important option, the Pulitzer Board believes that the Music Prize, in its own annual competition, should encompass the nation's array of distinguished music and hopes that the refinements in the Prize's definition, guidelines and jury membership will serve that end.”

In 2006, a posthumous "Special Citation" was given to jazz composer Thelonious Monk, and in 2007 the prize went to Ornette Coleman, a free jazz composer, for his disc Sound Grammar, a recording of a 2005 concert, the first time a recording won the music Pulitzer, and a first for purely improvised music.

In 2018, rapper Kendrick Lamar won the award for his 2017 hip hop album Damn. The recording was the first musical work not in the jazz or classical genre to win the prize.

Criticism 

In 2004, Donald Martino, the 1974 winner, said, "If you write music long enough, sooner or later, someone is going to take pity on you and give you the damn thing. It is not always the award for the best piece of the year; it has gone to whoever hasn't gotten it before."

John Corigliano, the 2001 winner, said that although the prize was intended for music that meant something to the world, it had become a very different kind of award, "by composers for composers" and "mired in a pool of rotating jurors."

Composer and music critic Kyle Gann complained in his essay "The Uptown Prejudice Against Downtown Music" that the judges for the Pulitzer and other top awards for composition often included "the same seven names over and over as judges": Gunther Schuller, Joseph Schwantner, Jacob Druckman, George Perle, John Harbison, Mario Davidovsky, and Bernard Rands. Gann argued that "Downtown" composers like himself did not win awards because the composer-judges were all "white men, all of them coming pretty much from the same narrow Eurocentric aesthetic.... These seven men have determined who wins the big prizes in American music for the last two decades. They have made sure that Downtown composers never win."

After winning the Pulitzer in 2003, John Adams expressed "ambivalence bordering on contempt" because "most of the country's greatest musical minds" have been ignored in favor of academic music.

Schuller welcomed the broadening of the eligibility criteria for the prize in 2004: "This is a long overdue sea change in the whole attitude as to what can be considered for the prize. It is an opening up to different styles and not at all to different levels of quality." Composer Olly Wilson agreed that the changes were "a move in the right direction" because they acknowledge "a wider spectrum of music, including music that is not written down." Some other former prize winners disagreed. Harbison called it "a horrible development", adding, "If you were to impose a comparable standard on fiction you would be soliciting entries from the authors of airport novels." According to Martino, the prize had "already begun to go in the direction of permitting less serious stuff" before the 2004 changes. Lewis Spratlan, who won the prize in 2000, also objected, saying "The Pulitzer is one of the very few prizes that award artistic distinction in front-edge, risk-taking music. To dilute this objective by inviting the likes of musicals and movie scores, no matter how excellent, is to undermine the distinctiveness and capability for artistic advancement." In 2018, 1970 winner Charles Wuorinen denounced the jury for awarding the music award to Lamar, telling the New York Times the decision constituted "the final disappearance of any societal interest in high culture."

Winners
In its first 71 years, the Music Pulitzer was awarded 67 times; it was never split, and no prize was given in 1953, 1964, 1965, or 1981.

1940s
 1943: William Schuman, Secular Cantata No. 2: A Free Song
 1944: Howard Hanson, Symphony No. 4, Requiem
 1945: Aaron Copland, Appalachian Spring, ballet
 1946: Leo Sowerby, The Canticle of the Sun
 1947: Charles Ives, Symphony No. 3
 1948: Walter Piston, Symphony No. 3
 1949: Virgil Thomson, Louisiana Story, film score

1950s
 1950: Gian Carlo Menotti, The Consul, opera 
 1951: Douglas Stuart Moore, Giants in the Earth, opera
 1952: Gail Kubik, Symphony Concertante
 1953: no prize awarded
 1954: Quincy Porter, Concerto Concertante for two pianos and orchestra
 1955: Gian Carlo Menotti, The Saint of Bleecker Street, opera
 1956: Ernst Toch, Symphony No. 3
 1957: Norman Dello Joio, Meditations on Ecclesiastes
 1958: Samuel Barber, Vanessa, opera
 1959: John La Montaine, Piano Concerto No. 1, Op. 9.

1960s
 1960: Elliott Carter, String Quartet No. 2
 1961: Walter Piston, Symphony No. 7
 1962: Robert Ward, The Crucible, opera
 1963: Samuel Barber, Piano Concerto
 1964: no prize awarded
 1965: no prize awarded (See Duke Ellington)
 1966: Leslie Bassett, Variations for Orchestra
 1967: Leon Kirchner, Quartet No. 3 for strings and electronic tape
 1968: George Crumb, Echoes of Time and the River
 1969: Karel Husa, String Quartet No. 3

1970s
 1970: Charles Wuorinen, Time's Encomium
 1971: Mario Davidovsky, Synchronisms No. 6 for Piano and Electronic Sound (1970)
 1972: Jacob Druckman, Windows
 1973: Elliott Carter, String Quartet No. 3
 1974: Donald Martino, Notturno
 1975: Dominick Argento, From the Diary of Virginia Woolf
 1976: Ned Rorem, Air Music
 1977: Richard Wernick, Visions of Terror and Wonder
 1978: Michael Colgrass, Deja Vu for percussion and orchestra
 1979: Joseph Schwantner, Aftertones of Infinity

1980s
Indented entries are finalists after each year's winner.
 1980: David Del Tredici, In Memory of a Summer Day
 Morton Subotnick, After the Butterfly
 Lukas Foss, Quintets for Orchestra 
 1981: no prize awarded
 1982: Roger Sessions, Concerto for Orchestra
 1983: Ellen Zwilich, Three Movements for Orchestra (Symphony No. 1)
 Vivian Fine, Drama for Orchestra
 1984: Bernard Rands, Canti del Sole
 Peter Lieberson, Piano Concerto,
 1985: Stephen Albert, Symphony No. 1 RiverRun
 William Bolcom, Songs of Innocence and Experience, a Musical Illumination of the Poems of William Blake
 1986: George Perle, Wind Quintet No. 4, for flute, oboe, clarinet, horn, and bassoon
George Rochberg, Symphony No. 5
 1987: John Harbison, The Flight into Egypt
 Stephen Albert, Flower of the Mountain
 1988: William Bolcom, 12 New Etudes for Piano
 Gunther Schuller, Concerto For String Quartet and Orchestra
 1989: Roger Reynolds, Whispers Out of Time
 Steven Stucky, Concerto for Orchestra
 Bright Sheng, H'un (Lacerations): In Memoriam 1966–1976

1990s
 1990: Mel D. Powell, Duplicates: A Concerto
 Ralph Shapey, Concerto for Cello, Piano, and String Orchestra 
 1991: Shulamit Ran, Symphony
 Bright Sheng, Four Movements for Piano
 Charles Fussell,  Wilde
 1992: Wayne Peterson, The Face of the Night, the Heart of the Dark
 Ralph Shapey, Concerto Fantastique 
 1993: Christopher Rouse, Trombone Concerto
 Leon Kirchner, Music for Cello and Orchestra
Joan Tower, Violin Concerto 
 1994: Gunther Schuller, Of Reminiscences and Reflections
 Aaron Jay Kernis, Still Movement with Hymn 
 Charles Wuorinen, Microsymphony 
 1995: Morton Gould, Stringmusic
 Donald Erb, Evensong
 Andrew Imbrie, Adam 
 1996: George Walker, Lilacs, for soprano and orchestra
 Peter Lieberson, Variations for Violin and Piano 
 Elliott Carter, Adagio tenebroso
 1997: Wynton Marsalis, Blood on the Fields, oratorio
 John Musto, Dove Sta Amore
 Stanisław Skrowaczewski, Passacaglia Immaginaria
 1998: Aaron Jay Kernis, String Quartet No. 2, Musica Instrumentalis
 John Adams, Century Rolls
 Yehudi Wyner, Horntrio
 1999: Melinda Wagner, Concerto for Flute, Strings, and Percussion
 David Rakowski, Persistent Memory 
 Stanisław Skrowaczewski, Concerto for Orchestra

2000s
 2000: Lewis Spratlan, Life Is a Dream, opera (awarded for concert version of Act II)
 Donald Martino: Serenata Concertante
 John Zorn: contes de fees
 2001: John Corigliano, Symphony No. 2, for string orchestra
 Stephen Hartke, Tituli
 Fred Lerdahl, Time After Time
 2002: Henry Brant, Ice Field
 Peter Lieberson, Rilke Songs
 David Rakowski, Ten of a Kind
 2003: John Adams, On the Transmigration of Souls
 Steve Reich: Three Tales
 Paul Schoenfield: Camp Songs
 2004: Paul Moravec, Tempest Fantasy
 Steve Reich: Cello Counterpoint
 Peter Lieberson: Piano Concerto No. 3
 2005: Steven Stucky, Second Concerto for Orchestra
 Steve Reich: You Are (Variations)
 Elliott Carter: Dialogues
 2006: Yehudi Wyner, Chiavi in Mano (piano concerto)
 Peter Lieberson: Neruda Songs
 Chen Yi: Si Ji (Four Seasons)
 2007: Ornette Coleman, Sound Grammar
 Elliot Goldenthal: Grendel
 Augusta Read Thomas: Astral Canticle
 2008: David Lang, The Little Match Girl Passion
 Stephen Hartke: Meanwhile
 Roberto Sierra: Concerto for Viola
 2009: Steve Reich, Double Sextet
 Don Byron: 7 Etudes for Solo Piano
 Harold Meltzer: Brion

2010s
 2010: Jennifer Higdon, Violin Concerto
 Fred Lerdahl: String Quartet No. 3
 Julia Wolfe: Steel Hammer
 2011: Zhou Long, Madame White Snake, opera
 Fred Lerdahl: Arches
 Ricardo Zohn-Muldoon: Comala
 2012: Kevin Puts, Silent Night: Opera in Two Acts
 Tod Machover: Death and the Powers
 Andrew Norman: The Companion Guide to Rome
 2013: Caroline Shaw, Partita for 8 Voices
 Aaron Jay Kernis: Pieces of Winter Sky
 Wadada Leo Smith: Ten Freedom Summers
 2014: John Luther Adams, Become Ocean
 John Adams: The Gospel According to the Other Mary
 Christopher Cerrone: Invisible Cities
 2015: Julia Wolfe, Anthracite Fields
 Lei Liang: Xiaoxiang
 John Zorn: The Aristos
 2016: Henry Threadgill, In for a Penny, In for a Pound
 Timo Andres: The Blind Banister
 Carter Pann: The Mechanics: Six from the Shop Floor
 2017: Du Yun, Angel's Bone, opera 
 Ashley Fure: Bound to the Bow
 Kate Soper: Ipsa Dixit
 2018: Kendrick Lamar, Damn, album
 Michael Gilbertson: Quartet
 Ted Hearne: Sound from the Bench
 2019: Ellen Reid, Prism, opera
James Romig, Still
 Andrew Norman, Sustain

2020s
 2020: Anthony Davis, The Central Park Five, opera
Alex Weiser, and all the days were purple
Michael Torke, Sky: Concerto for Violin
 2021: Tania León, Stride
Maria Schneider, Data Lords
Ted Hearne, Place
 2022: Raven Chacon, Voiceless Mass
Anne Leilehua Lanzilotti, with eyes the color of time
Andy Akiho, Seven Pillars

Additional citations
 1974: Roger Sessions (1896–1985)
 1976: Scott Joplin (1868–1917, posthumous)
 1982: Milton Babbitt (1916–2011)
 1985: William Schuman (1910–1992)
 1998: George Gershwin (1898–1937, posthumous)
 1999: Duke Ellington (1899–1974, posthumous)
 2006: Thelonious Monk (1917–1982, posthumous)
 2007: John Coltrane (1926–1967, posthumous)
 2008: Bob Dylan (born 1941)
 2010: Hank Williams (1923–1953, posthumous)
 2019: Aretha Franklin (1942–2018, posthumous)

Repeat winners

Four people have won the Pulitzer Prize for Music twice: 
 Walter Piston, 1948, 1961
 Gian Carlo Menotti, 1950, 1955
 Samuel Barber, 1958, 1963
 Elliott Carter, 1960, 1973

References

Further reading

External links

 
 The Pulitzer Prize for Music: A Sonic Gallery

Music
American music awards
Awards established in 1943
1943 establishments in the United States